Roberto Cruz may refer to:

Roberto Cruz (boxer) (born 1941), Filipino boxer
Roberto Cruz (taekwondo) (born 1972), Filipino  taekwondo practitioner